Jake Ian McLeod (born 13 August 1994) is an Australian professional golfer currently playing on the PGA Tour of Australasia. In 2018, he won the tour's Order of Merit, the same year he received his first professional win.

Career
McLeod turned professional in 2015. His first professional win came in 2018 at the New South Wales Open, beating Cameron John by two strokes. His 62 in the third round of the tournament beat the course record at Twin Creeks Golf and Country Club. 

McLeod won the Order of Merit on the PGA Tour of Australasia in 2018, earning a one-year exemption to the PGA European Tour in 2019 and an invitation to the 2019 Open Championship.

Professional wins (1)

PGA Tour of Australasia wins (1)

PGA Tour of Australasia playoff record (0–1)

Results in major championships

CUT = missed the halfway cut

Results in World Golf Championships

"T" = Tied

Team appearances
Amateur
Australian Men's Interstate Teams Matches (representing Queensland): 2013 (winners), 2014, 2015

See also
2019 European Tour Qualifying School graduates

References

External links 
 
 
 
 

Australian male golfers
PGA Tour of Australasia golfers
European Tour golfers
Sportspeople from Townsville
1994 births
Living people